Henry Maull (1829–1914) was a British photographer who specialised in portraits of noted individuals.

Biography
Maull was born in Clerkenwell as the son of a tradesman.  He married Eliza (b Islington 1831) and became a member of the Royal Photographic Society in 1870.

Henry Maull formed several partnerships during his career:

 1856 - 8 March 1865: Maull & Polyblank in partnership with George Henry Polyblank.  Other sources say it was established in 1854.
 1866-1872: Maull, Henry & Co

 1873-1878: Maull & Co

 1879-1885: Maull & Fox, in partnership with John Fox (1832 - 1907). The studio continued under the original name by others and moved to 200 Gray's Inn Road.  It was officially closed on 26 October 1928 and the final creditors' meeting was held on 30 November 1928. The firm was taken over by the Graphic Photo Union, which in turn was taken over by Kemsley Newspapers.

Maull operated studios at the following locations:
 62 Cheapside, City of London March 1865 - 1871.
 Tavistock House, 252 Fulham Road, Chelsea March 1865 - 1869.
 187a Piccadilly, Westminster March 1865 - 1871.

Works
 Portraits of Members of Parliament by Maull and Polyblank, 163 photographs
 Portraits of noted individuals, which were frequently published as engravings in the Illustrated London News
 Photographs of Fellows from the mid-nineteenth century until the early twentieth century.

Photographic Portraits of Living Celebrities
Photographic Portraits of Living Celebrities was published from 1856 to 1859, featuring forty individual portraits with accompanying biographies by Herbert Fry, Pts 1 - 4; later parts by Edward Walford, issued to subscribers over a period of forty-one months and eventually all published in a single volume London, W. Kent, 1859. Vol I

The issues published were:
 May 1856. Professor Owen
 June 1856. Thomas Babington Macaulay, 1st Baron Macaulay
 July 1856. Robert Stephenson
 August 1856. John Arthur Roebuck
 September 1856. Sir Benjamin Collins Brodie, 2nd Baronet
 October 1856. Edward Hodges Baily
 November 1856. Samuel Warren (British lawyer)
 December 1856. Professor Thomas Graham
 January 1857. Edward Matthew Ward
 February 1857. Lord Campbell 
 March 1857. George Cruikshank
 April 1857. Rowland Hill 
 May 1857. Sir William Fenwick Williams
 June 1857. William P. Frith
 July 1857. Cardinal Wiseman
 August 1857. Lord Brougham
 September 1857. Martin Farquhar Tupper
 October 1857. Michael Faraday
 November 1857. John Gibson (sculptor) 
 December 1857. Earl of Rosse
 January 1858. Charles Kean
 February 1858. William Ewart Gladstone
 March 1858. Sir Archibald Alison
 April 1858. William Sterndale Bennett
 May 1858. David Livingstone
 June 1858. Earl of Aberdeen
 July 1858. Daniel Maclise
 August 1858. Lord Stanley
 September 1858. Dr Tait, Bishop of London (later Archbishop of Canterbury)
 October 1858. Austen Henry Layard
 November 1858. Clarkson Stanfield
 December 1858. Lord Panmure
 January 1859. John Baldwin Buckstone
 February 1859. Comte de Montalambert
 March 1859. Samuel Lover
 April 1859. Lord John Manners
 May 1859. Bishop of Oxford Samuel Wilberforce
 June 1859. Sir John Lawrence
 July 1859. Lord Colchester
 August 1859. Archbishop of Canterbury John Bird Sumner

References

Further reading
   illus of cdvs

External links

 Maull Portrait Photograph Collection, The Royal Society
 Collection of the Month - Maull Photographs
 Collection catalog

British portrait photographers
1829 births
1914 deaths
19th-century English photographers
Photographers from London